Military Intelligence  (Czech; Vojenské zpravodajství, abbreviated as VZ) is the military intelligence service of the Czech Republic with activities in such fields as Imagery Intelligence (IMINT), Human Intelligence (HUMINT), Signal Intelligence (SIGINT), Open Sources Intelligence (OSINT). The agency also procures intelligence from co-operation with two or more intelligence agencies at a time. While Military Intelligence activities are directed all around the world, most activities are focused on so called "crisis regions" such as the Balkans, the Middle East, Afghanistan – Pakistan, Commonwealth of Independent States and Africa. In the past, Military Intelligence has cooperated with several intelligence agencies such as Security Information Service, Office for Foreign Relations and Information, Ministry of Foreign Affairs, Police of the Czech Republic, General Customs Directorate.

Czech Military Intelligence also predicted the annexation of Crimea and development of Ukraine. Military Intelligence also reported that Russia is trying to change the internal political situation in post-Soviet states where the most successful change was in Ukraine.

History
The history of the Military Intelligence (Vojenského Zpravodajství) dates back to the first world war when the first intelligence groups were formed in the Czechoslovak Legions. The foundation of what would be Czech military intelligence would be laid down on October 28, 1918.

Director
The current director of Military Intelligence is Lieutenant General Jan Beroun who was born in 1962. He graduated from the FBI National Academy in Quantico, Virginia, United States. He became director of Military Intelligence on 22 October 2014. He is skilled in English and a passive speaker of Russian.

See also
 Office of Foreign Relations and Information
 Security Information Service

References

Czech intelligence community
Military of Czechoslovakia
Military of the Czech Republic
Military intelligence agencies